Shep Langdon (January 25, 1934 – January 6, 2014) was an American professional stock car racing driver. He was a driver in the NASCAR Grand National Series from 1957 to 1960.

References

1934 births
2014 deaths
Racing drivers from North Carolina
NASCAR drivers